Nasty Bits may refer to:

 "Nasty Bits" (EP), a promotional single by Beastie Boys, used to promote Hello Nasty
 The Nasty Bits, a book by Anthony Bourdain
 "nasty bits", a commonly used alternate name for offal, often used in an endearing, ironic way

See also
 Soft error, when data is misread in electronics and computing resulting in "bad bits", or "flipped bits"